For the 2014 Indian general election, the candidates for the 16th Lok Sabha (lower house of the India parliament) of the United Democratic Front of Kerala were as follows:

See also 

 List of Constituencies of the Lok Sabha
 List of National Democratic Alliance candidates in the 2014 Indian general election
 List of United Progressive Alliance candidates in the 2014 Indian general election
 List of West Bengal Left Front candidates in the 2014 Indian general election

References 

Indian general elections in Kerala
Lists of Indian political candidates